This is a list of schools in Nottinghamshire, England.

State-funded schools

Primary schools

 Abbey Gates Primary School, Ravenshead
 Abbey Hill Primary School, Kirkby-in-Ashfield
 Abbey Primary School, Forest Town
 Abbey Road Primary School, West Bridgford
 Albany Infant School, Stapleford
 Albany Junior School, Stapleford
 Alderman Pounder Infant School, Beeston
 All Hallows CE Primary School, Gedling
 All Saints CE/Methodist Primary School, Elston
 Annesley Primary School, Annesley Woodhouse
 Archbishop Cranmer CE Primary Academy, Aslockton
 Arnbrook Primary School, Arnold
 Arno Vale Junior School, Woodthorpe
 Arnold Mill Primary School, Arnold
 Arnold View Primary School, Arnold
 Asquith Primary School, Mansfield
 Awsworth Primary School, Awsworth
 Bagthorpe Primary School, Bagthorpe
 Barnby Road Academy, Newark-on-Trent
 Beardall Fields Primary School, Hucknall
 Beckingham Primary School, Beckingham
 Beeston Fields Primary School, Beeston
 Beeston Rylands Junior School, Beeston
 Berry Hill Primary School, Mansfield
 Bilsthorpe Flying High Academy, Bilsthorpe
 Bingham Primary School, Bingham
 Birklands Primary School, Warsop
 Bishop Alexander LEAD Academy, Newark-on-Trent
 Bleasby CE Primary School, Bleasby
 Blidworth Oaks Primary School, Blidworth
 The Bramble Academy, Mansfield Woodhouse
 Bracken Lane Academy, Retford
 Bramcote CE Primary School, Bramcote
 Bramcote Hills Primary School, Bramcote Hills
 Brierley Forest Primary School, Sutton-in-Ashfield
 Brinsley Primary School, Brinsley
 Brookside Primary School, East Leake
 Broomhill Junior School, Hucknall
 Bunny CE Primary School, Bunny
 Burntstump Seely CE Primary Academy, Arnold
 Burton Joyce Primary School, Burton Joyce
 Butler's Hill Infant School, Hucknall
 The Carlton Infant Academy, Carlton
 The Carlton Junior Academy, Carlton
 Carnarvon Primary School, Bingham
 Carr Hill Primary School, Retford
 Caunton Dean Hole CE Primary School, Caunton
 Chetwynd Primary Academy, Toton
 Christ Church CE Primary School, Newark-on-Trent
 Church Vale Primary School, Church Warsop
 Chuter Ede Primary School, Balderton
 Clarborough Primary School, Clarborough
 Coddington CE Primary School, Coddington
 Coppice Farm Primary School, Arnold
 Costock CE Primary School, Costock
 Cotgrave Candleby Lane School, Cotgrave
 Cotgrave CE Primary School, Cotgrave
 Crescent Primary School, Mansfield
 Croft Primary School, Sutton-in-Ashfield
 Cropwell Bishop Primary School, Cropwell Bishop
 Crossdale Primary School, Keyworth
 Cuckney CE Primary School, Cuckney
 Dalestorth Primary School,  Sutton-in-Ashfield
 Dunham-on-Trent CE Primary School, Dunham-on-Trent
 East Bridgford St Peters CE Academy, East Bridgford
 East Markham Primary School, East Markham
 Eastlands Junior School, Meden Vale
 Edwalton Primary School, Edwalton
 Elkesley Primary School, Elkesley
 Ernehale Infant School, Arnold
 Ernehale Junior School, Arnold
 Eskdale Junior School, Chilwell
 Everton Primary School, Everton
 Fairfield Primary Academy, Stapleford
 Farmilo Primary School, Mansfield
 Farnsfield St Michael's CE Primary School, Farnsfield
 Flintham Primary School, Flintham
 The Florence Nightingale Academy, Eastwood
 The Flying High Academy, Mansfield
 Forest Glade Primary School, Sutton-in-Ashfield
 Forest Town Primary School, Forest Town
 The Forest View Academy, New Ollerton
 Gamston CE Primary School, Gamston
 Gateford Park Primary School, Gateford Park
 Gilthill Primary School, Kimberley
 The Good Shepherd RC Primary School, Woodthorpe
 Gotham Primary School, Gotham
 Greasley Beauvale Primary School, Newthorpe
 Greenwood Primary School, Kirkby-in-Ashfield
 Greythorn Primary School, West Bridgford
 Gunthorpe CE Primary School, Gunthorpe
 Haddon Primary School, Carlton
 Haggonfields Primary School, Rhodesia
 Halam CE Primary School, Halam
 Hallcroft Infant School, Retford
 Harworth CE Academy, Harworth
 Hawthorne Primary School, Bestwood Village
 Healdswood Infants' School, Skegby
 Heatherley Primary School, Forest Town
 Heathlands Primary School, Rainworth
 Hetts Lane Infant School, Warsop
 Heymann Primary School, Wilford Hill
 High Oakham Primary School, Mansfield
 Hillocks Primary Academy, Sutton-in-Ashfield
 Hillside Primary School, Hucknall
 Holgate Primary School, Hucknall
 Holly Hill Primary School, Selston
 Holly Primary School, Forest Town
 Hollywell Primary School, Kimberley
 Holy Cross RC Primary Academy, Hucknall
 Holy Family RC Primary School, Worksop
 Holy Trinity CE Infant School, Southwell
 Holy Trinity RC Academy, Newark
 Horsendale Primary School, Nuthall
 Hucknall Flying High Academy, Hucknall
 Hucknall National CE Primary School, Hucknall
 Huthwaite All Saint's CE Infant School, Huthwaite
 Intake Farm Primary School, Mansfield
 Jacksdale Primary School, Jacksdale
 James Peacock Infant School, Ruddington
 Jesse Gray Primary School, West Bridgford
 John Blow Primary School, Collingham
 John Clifford Primary School, Beeston
 John Hunt Academy, New Balderton
 John T Rice Infant School, Forest Town
 Keyworth Primary School, Keyworth
 Killisick Junior School, Arnold
 Kimberley Primary School, Kimberley
 King Edward Primary School, Mansfield
 King Edwin Primary School, Edwinstowe
 The King's CE Primary Academy, Newark-on-Trent
 Kingston Park Academy, Carlton in Lindrick
 Kingsway Primary School, Kirkby-in-Ashfield
 Kinoulton Primary School, Kinoulton
 Kirkby Woodhouse School, Kirkby-in-Ashfield
 Kirklington Primary School, Kirklington
 Kneesall CE Primary School, Kneesall
 Lady Bay Primary School, West Bridgford
 Lake View Primary School, Rainworth
 Lambley Primary School, Lambley
 The Lanes Primary School, Beeston
 Langar CE Primary School, Langar
 Langold Dyscarr Community School, Langold
 Lantern Lane Primary School, East Leake
 Larkfields Infant School, Nuthall
 Larkfields Junior School, Nuthall
 Lawrence View Primary School, Eastwood
 Leamington Primary Academy, Sutton-in-Ashfield
 Leas Park Junior School, Mansfield Woodhouse
 Leen Mills Primary School, Hucknall
 Leverton CE Academy, North Leverton
 Linby-cum-Papplewick CE Primary School, Linby
 Lovers Lane Primary School, Newark-on-Trent
 Lowdham CE Primary School, Lowdham
 Lowe's Wong CE Methodist Junior School, Southwell
 Lowe's Wong Infant School, Southwell
 Manor Park Infant School, Calverton
 Mansfield Primary Academy, Mansfield
 Mapperley Plains Primary School, Mapperley
 Mapplewells Primary School, Sutton-in-Ashfield
 Mattersey Primary School, Mattersey
 Maun Infant School, New Ollerton
 Millside Spencer Academy, East Leake
 The Minster School, Southwell
 Misson Primary School, Misson
 Misterton Primary School, Misterton
 Mornington Primary School, Nuthall
 Morven Park Primary School, Kirkby-in-Ashfield
 Mount CE Primary School, Newark-on-Trent
 Muskham Primary School, North Muskham
 Netherfield Infant School, Meden Vale
 Netherfield Primary School, Netherfield
 Nettleworth Infant School, Mansfield Woodhouse
 Newlands Junior School, Forest Town
 Newstead Primary School, Newstead
 Norbridge Academy, Worksop
 Normanton-on-Soar Primary School, Normanton on Soar
 North Clifton Primary School, North Clifton
 North Wheatley CE Primary School, South Wheatley
 Northfield Primary School, Mansfield Woodhouse
 Norwell CE Primary School, Norwell
 Oak Tree Primary School, Mansfield
 Orchard Primary School, Kirkby-in-Ashfield
 Ordsall Primary School, Retford
 Orston Primary School, Orston
 Parkdale Primary School, Carlton
 The Parkgate Academy, New Ollerton
 Peafield Lane Academy, Mansfield Woodhouse
 Phoenix Infant School, Gedling
 Pierrepont Gamston Primary School, West Bridgford
 Pinewood Infant School, Arnold
 Porchester Junior School, Carlton
 Priestsic Primary School, Sutton-in-Ashfield
 The Primary School of St Mary and St Martin, Blyth
 Priory Junior School, Gedling
 The Priory RC Academy, Eastwood
 Prospect Hill Infant School, Worksop
 Prospect Hill Junior School, Worksop
 The Python Hill Academy, Rainworth
 Queen Eleanor Primary School, Harby
 Radcliffe-on-Trent Infant School, Radcliffe-on-Trent
 Radcliffe-on-Trent Junior School, Radcliffe-on-Trent
 Rampton Primary School, Rampton
 Ramsden Primary School, Carlton in Lindrick
 Ranby CE Primary School, Ranby
 Ravenshead CE Primary School, Ravenshead
 Redlands Primary School, Worksop
 Richard Bonington Primary School, Arnold
 Rivendell Flying High Academy, Stoke Bardolph
 Robert Mellors Primary Academy, Arnold
 Robert Miles Infant School, Bingham
 Robert Miles Junior School, Bingham
 Rosecliffe Spencer Academy, Edwalton
 Round Hill Primary School, Beeston
 The Sacred Heart RC Primary Academy, Carlton
 St Andrew's CE Primary School, Skegby
 St Anne's CE Primary School, Worksop
 The St Augustine's Academy, Kilton
 St Edmund Campion RC Primary School, West Bridgford
 St Edmund's CE Primary School, Mansfield Woodhouse
 St John the Baptist CE Primary School, Colwick
 St John's CE Academy, Worksop
 St John's CE Primary School, Stapleford
 St Joseph's RC Primary School, Boughton
 St Joseph's RC Primary School, Retford
 St Luke's CE Primary School, Shireoaks
 St Mary Magdalene CE Primary School, Sutton-in-Ashfield
 St Mary's CE Primary School, Edwinstowe
 St Matthew's CE Primary School, Normanton on Trent
 St Patrick's RC Primary School, Bircotes
 St Patrick's RC Primary School, Mansfield
 St Peter's CE Junior School, Ruddington
 St Peter's CE Primary Academy, Mansfield
 St Peter's CE Primary School Gringley on the Hill
 St Peter's CE Primary School, Farndon
 St Philip Neri With St Bede RC Academy, Mansfield
 St Swithun's CE Primary Academy, Retford
 St Wilfrid's CE Primary School, Calverton
 Samuel Barlow Primary Academy, Clipstone
 Selston CE Infant School, Selston
 Serlby Park Academy, Bircotes
 Sherwood Junior School, Warsop
 The Sir Donald Bailey Academy, Newark
 Sir Edmund Hillary Primary School, Kilton
 Sir John Sherbrooke Junior School, Calverton
 Skegby Junior Academy, Skegby
 Sparken Hill Academy, Worksop
 Springbank Academy, Eastwood
 Standhill Infants' School, Carlton
 Stanhope Primary School, Gedling
 Sturton CE Primary School, Sturton le Steeple
 Sunnyside Spencer Academy, Beeston
 Sutton Bonington Primary School, Sutton Bonington
 Sutton Road Primary School, Mansfield
 Sutton-cum-Lound CE School, Sutton cum Lound
 Sutton-on-Trent Primary School, Sutton-on-Trent
 Thrumpton Primary Academy, Retford
 Tollerton Primary School, Tollerton
 Toton Banks Road Infant School, Toton
 Toton Bispham Drive Junior School, Toton
 Trent Vale Infant School, Beeston
 Trowell CE Primary School, Trowell
 Tuxford Primary Academy, Tuxford
 Underwood CE Primary School, Underwood
 Wadsworth Fields Primary School, Stapleford
 Wainwright Primary Academy,  Mansfield
 Walesby CE Primary School, Walesby
 Walkeringham Primary School, Walkeringham
 West Bridgford Infant School, West Bridgford
 West Bridgford Junior School, West Bridgford
 The West Park Academy, Kirkby-in-Ashfield
 Westdale Infant School, Mapperley
 Westdale Junior School, Mapperley
 Westwood Infant School, Jacksdale
 William Lilley Infant School, Stapleford
 Willoughby Primary School, Willoughby on the Wolds
 Willow Brook Primary School, Keyworth
 Willow Farm Primary School, Gedling
 Winthorpe Primary School, Winthorpe
 Woodland View Primary School, Huthwaite
 Wood's Foundation CE Primary School, Woodborough
 Woodthorpe Infant School, Woodthorpe
 Worksop Priory CE Primary Academy, Worksop
 Wynndale Primary School, Mansfield

Secondary schools

 Alderman White School, Bramcote
 All Saints' Catholic Academy, Mansfield
 Arnold Hill Academy, Arnold
 Ashfield School, Kirkby-in-Ashfield
 The Becket School, West Bridgford
 Bramcote College, Bramcote
 The Brunts Academy, Mansfield
 The Carlton Academy, Carlton
 Carlton le Willows Academy, Gedling
 Chilwell School, Beeston
 Christ the King Catholic Voluntary Academy, Arnold
 Colonel Frank Seely Academy, Calverton
 The Dukeries Academy, New Ollerton
 East Leake Academy, East Leake
 The Elizabethan Academy, Retford
 The Garibaldi School, Forest Town
 George Spencer Academy, Stapleford
 Hall Park Academy, Eastwood
 The Holgate Academy, Hucknall
 Joseph Whitaker School, Rainworth
 Kimberley School, Kimberley
 Magnus Church of England Academy, Newark-on-Trent
 The Manor Academy, Mansfield Woodhouse
 Meden School, Warsop
 The Minster School, Southwell
 The National Academy, Hucknall
 The Newark Academy, Balderton
 Outwood Academy Kirkby, Kirkby-in-Ashfield
 Outwood Academy Portland, Worksop
 Outwood Academy Valley, Worksop
 Quarrydale Academy, Sutton-in-Ashfield
 Queen Elizabeth's Academy, Mansfield
 Redhill Academy, Arnold
 Retford Oaks Academy, Retford
 Rushcliffe School, West Bridgford
 Samworth Church Academy, Mansfield
 Selston High School, Selston
 Serlby Park Academy, Bircotes
 South Nottinghamshire Academy, Radcliffe-on-Trent
 South Wolds Academy, Keyworth
 The Suthers School, Fernwood
 Sutton Community Academy, Sutton-in-Ashfield
 Toot Hill School, Bingham
 Tuxford Academy, Tuxford
 West Bridgford School, West Bridgford

Special and alternative schools

 Ash Lea School, Cotgrave
 The Beech Academy, Mansfield
 Bracken Hill School, Kirkby-in-Ashfield
 Carlton Digby School, Mapperley
 Derrymount School, Arnold
 Fountaindale School, Mansfield
 Foxwood Academy, Bramcote
 Newark Orchard School, Balderton
 Redgate Primary Academy, Mansfield
 St Giles School, Retford
 Yeoman Park Academy, Mansfield Woodhouse

Further education
 Central College Nottingham
 Lincoln College
 New College Nottingham
 North Nottinghamshire College
 Portland College
 Vision West Nottinghamshire College

Independent schools

Primary and preparatory schools
 Colston Bassett School, Colston Bassett
 Highfields School, Newark-on-Trent
 Plumtree School, Plumtree
 Salterford House School, Calverton
 Saville House School, Mansfield Woodhouse
 Wellow House School, Wellow
 The Worksop Montessori School, Worksop

Senior and all-through schools
 Orchard School, South Leverton
 Worksop College, Worksop

Special and alternative schools

 A Place to Call Our Own, Mansfield
 Blue Mountain Education, Cossall
 Dawn House School, Rainworth
 Easthorpe School, Ruddington
 Hope House School, Balderton
 Pollyteach, Kirkby-in-Ashfield
 Progression 2work Wrap-Around Learning Hub, Newthorpe
 REAL Alternative Provision School, Mansfield
 REAL Independent School, Blidworth
 Venture Learning, Netherfield
 Westbourne School, Sutton-in-Ashfield
 Wings School, Kirklington

Further education
 The School of Artisan Food

References

Nottinghamshire
Schools in Nottinghamshire
Lists of buildings and structures in Nottinghamshire